Metlakatla Seaplane Base  is a state owned, public use seaplane base located in Metlakatla, a community on Annette Island in the Prince of Wales-Hyder Census Area of the U.S. state of Alaska.

As per Federal Aviation Administration records, the airport had 3,344 passenger boardings (enplanements) in calendar year 2008, 3,403 enplanements in 2009, and 4,140 in 2010. It is included in the National Plan of Integrated Airport Systems for 2011–2015, which categorized it as a non-primary commercial service airport (between 2,500 and 10,000 enplanements per year).

Facilities and aircraft 
Metlakatla Seaplane Base has two seaplane landing areas designated E/W and N/S, each measuring 5,000 by 5,000 feet (1,524 x 1,524 m). For the 12-month period ending December 31, 2006, the airport had 325 aircraft operations, an average of 27 per month: 77% air taxi and 23% general aviation.

Airlines and destinations 
The following airlines offer scheduled passenger service:

Accidents and incidents
20 May 2019: Taquan Air Flight 20, a de Havilland Canada DHC-2 Beaver floatplane on a regularly scheduled commuter flight from Ketchikan Harbor Seaplane Base, overturned in the harbor during a water landing, destroying the aircraft and killing both persons aboard. The accident is under investigation by the National Transportation Safety Board.

References

External links 
 Topographic map from USGS The National Map

Airports in the Prince of Wales–Hyder Census Area, Alaska
Seaplane bases in Alaska